The pong lang is a xylophone from the Isan region of northeast Thailand. The instrument may be played as a standalone instrument, in pairs with one player playing melody and the other harmonizing, or as part of an orchestra. Players use carved two hardwood mallets.

The instrument is not standardized and the number of tone bars and their size can vary. Unlike the ranat ek lek and ranat thum lek which are strung over a box, the pong lang is hung from a post or tree with the string of tone bars arcing down toward the ground. wide to short. The number of tone bars varies, and 12 or 15 tone bars may make up a set. The wider bars with lower pitch sit at the top of the string and the other end (with smaller high-pitched bars) may be hooked to the player's toe or to a belt around the player's waist.

When there are two performers, they may sit on opposite sides of the post, facing one another. With two instruments, one plays the melody, the other plays a drone accompaniment or harmonics. The pong lang is mostly used for many occasions, especially for festivals and ceremonies. The instrument can be played solo or in an ensemble.

See also
Ranat
Ranat thum
Ranat ek lek
Ranat thum lek
Traditional Thai musical instruments
Luntang
Amadinda
Akadinda

References

External links
Sound clip of the pong lang.
Photo of Thai instruments. Pong lang is bottom right in photo.

Thai musical instruments
Keyboard percussion instruments
Isan culture